Tungsten trisulfide is an inorganic compound of tungsten and sulfur with the chemical formula WS3. The compound looks like chocolate-brown powder.

Synthesis
1. Bubbling hydrogen sulfide through hot acquefied solution of tungstenates:

Na3WS4 + H2SO4 = WS3 + Na2SO4 + H2S

2. Reaction of tungsten disulfide and elemental sulfur on heating:

WS2 + S = WS3

3. Precipitates upon acidification of thiotungstate solutions:
(NH4)2WS + HCl = WS3 + 2NH4Cl + H2S

Physical properties
Slightly soluble in cold water and forms colloidal solution in hot water. 

Soluble in alkali metal carbonates and alkali metal hydroxides.

Chemical properties
Tungsten trisulfide can be decomposed by heating into tungsten disulfide and elemental sulfur:
WS3 = WS2 + S

Reacts with sulfide solutions:
WS3 + (NH4)2S = (NH4)2WS4

Reduced by hydrogen:
WS3 + 3H2 = W + 3H2S

References

Tungsten compounds
Sulfides